Nambale is a settlement in Kenya's Busia County. The estimated population is 42,875, and the settlement lies at an elevation of 3,900 feet (1,200 m). Currently, it has continued to expand as there have been talks of construction of a sugar cane factory, to be situated between River Sio and M'nambale stream.

References 

Populated places in Western Province (Kenya)
Busia County